Shona is a French writer, composer and singer.

Biography
In 1985, she released a first single entitled "Panthère noire". Three years later, she released a single from her album Complètement mec, "Élodie mon rêve", dedicated to her niece, which hit #10 on the SNEP Top 50 and was charted for 16 weeks. Her next singles, "Au jour le jour", "Un Instant de vie" and "Les Sentiments", did not make the charts.

Discography

Albums
 1988 : Complètement mec

Singles
 1985 : "Panthère noire"
 1988 : "Élodie mon rêve" – #10 in France, Silver disc
 1988 : "Au jour le jour"
 1989 : "Un Instant de vie"
 1989 : "Les Sentiments"

References

French singer-songwriters
Living people
Shona
Year of birth missing (living people)